The Man from Nowhere may refer to:

 The Man from Nowhere (1937 film) (French: L'Homme de nulle part), a French film directed by Pierre Chenal
 The Man from Nowhere (comics), a story in the series of Dan Dare comics, first appearing in 1955
 The Man from Nowhere (1961 film), a Soviet film
 Arizona Colt, alternatively known as The Man from Nowhere, a 1966 Italian film directed by Michele Lupo
 "The Man from Nowhere" (Randall and Hopkirk (Deceased)), an episode of the British television series Randall and Hopkirk (Deceased), first shown in 1969
 The Man from Nowhere (2010 film), a Korean film directed by Lee Jeong-beom